The Honda XL125V Varadero is a dual-sport motorcycle with a 125 cc four stroke V-twin engine, produced by Honda since 2001.

Model history

2001–2007
The first generation of the Varadero 125 was released in the UK in 2001 aimed at the beginner rider market. Honda began working on a larger 125 motorcycle after the 15 metric horsepower restriction on all 125 cc motorcycles, with a marketing study suggesting that riders involved in this market were attracted by the idea of what Honda called a dual-sport motorcycle, which benefited from a protective nose fairing.

Following the cues taken from the XL1000V Varadero, Honda chose to power the new model with the 124 cc 4-stroke SOHC 4v 90° V-twin engine that was originally developed for the VT125C Shadow cruiser motorcycle. The new bike was fuelled through carburetors. The Varadero 125 engine revs to over 12,000 rpm; higher than most V-twin engines. It develops peak power at around 11,000 rpm, while in contrast its stablemate, the XL1000V Varadero, peaks its power at 6,000 rpm.

The engine sat in an all-new tubular steel frame designed for the new model, however the cast aluminium box-section swing arm was taken from the XL650V Transalp motorcycle (as was the rear luggage rack) and equipped with mono-shock rear suspension that provides  of travel. Front suspension is provided by 35 mm forks, also with 150 mm of travel.

The Varadero 125 was released with some fanfare, with Honda calling it the "new flagship of Honda's diverse 125 lineup" in the press information. There were also plenty of positive reviews of the new model, with most only citing the high price as the only criticism. The new Varadero 125 reportedly sold well with MCN reporting in January 2002 that it had sold over 380 units, roughly the same as its two bigger stablemates the XL1000V Varadero and the XL650V Transalp.

In 2003 the XL125V Varadero was given a minor facelift. The main being the three spoke, cast aluminium wheels being changed from black to silver in colour.

Since 2007
After the introduction of the Euro III Emission standards, the XL125V Varadero would either have needed to be withdrawn from production or modified. In 2007, Honda elected to continue with the model and so developed a new electronic fuel injection system based on the PGM-FI system used by other Honda motorcycles. At this time Honda also decided to bring about a major restyle to bring the model in line with company appearance trends at the time. The changes included a restyled front fairing which includes wind screen, indicators and headlight, an all new dashboard which now included a fuel reserve warning light and new fairing mounted wing mirrors, previously handlebar mounted.

Mechanically, the 2007 XL125V Varadero is similar to the previous model with the engine, gearbox, swing arm and rear suspension, luggage rack and steering all interchangeable as well as parts such as starter-motors, spark plugs and brakes also being interchangeable. However, the air intake has been turned through 90 degrees to be front facing and the fuel tank capacity has been reduced slightly to accommodate the new fuel injection system and ECU control unit.

To enable the bike to meet the new emission standards, the engine is now fuel-injected, is slightly de-tuned and has a catalytic converter. The 124 cc 4-valve V-twin now produces .

The Varadero 125 is now discontinued in the UK.

References

External links

XL125V Varadero at Honda UK

XL125V
Dual-sport motorcycles
Motorcycles introduced in 2001